Romauld Aguillera (born 2 February, 1979) is a retired Trinidadian football player.

Career statistics

International

References

External links
 

Trinidad and Tobago footballers
1979 births
Living people
2007 CONCACAF Gold Cup players

Association football defenders
Trinidad and Tobago international footballers